Superfly Best (stylized as Superfly BEST) is the 5th album from Japanese rock unit Superfly. It is the band's first greatest hits album, and commemorates the project's fifth anniversary. The album was released on September 25, 2013, and the two-disc set contains the band's 26 singles and three brand new tracks.

Background
On May 29, 2013, Superfly announced that they were going to be releasing a greatest hits album in September of that year. Following this announcement, the band was revealed to have recorded a theme song for J-Wave's 25th anniversary titled "Starting Over". A week later, the band announced the title of the album and its contents. A music video for new song "Always" was released on August 13, 2013, and its lyrics and video are meant to evoke a feeling of nostalgia. The album's lead track was announced on August 27, 2013, as "Bi-Li-Li Emotion" which would be used as the theme song for the drama Doctor-X: Surgeon Michiko Daimon starting in October 2013.

Superfly Best sold 157 thousand copies in its first week, making it Superfly's sixth consecutive number 1 album on the Oricon. She is only the second solo female artist to achieve this feat.

Track listing

Oricon Sales Chart

References

External links

2013 greatest hits albums
Superfly (band) albums
Warner Music Japan compilation albums